United States Revenue Cutter Commodore Perry was a  twin screw steamer built for the United States Revenue Cutter Service for use on the Great Lakes.

Service history
The Commodore Perry, often referred to as the Commodore, was a wooden-hulled, twin screw steamer. She was constructed in Buffalo, New York by Harry Whittacker, using his design and boilers he patented. She was laid down in 1864, made her trial voyage in July 1865 and later commissioned under the command of Captain Douglas Ottinger.

The Commodore served her entire 19-year career on the Great Lakes, enforcing tariff and trade laws, preventing smuggling, protecting the collection of Federal Revenue, and aiding mariners in distress. She was replaced in 1884 by a ship of the same name, .

Fate
In 1884, the Commodore Perry was sold and converted for use as a single screw passenger steamer. Renamed Periwinkle, She served in this capacity until 30 June 1897, when she caught fire and burnt to waters edge.

Service highlights
 25 September 1865- Transported former U.S. Ambassador to China Anson Burlingame from Cleveland, Ohio to Detroit, Michigan.
4 November 1867 - Helped rescue crewman of the propeller ship Acme, sunk near Dunkirk, New York.
June 1883 - Final voyage for the Revenue Service.
1884 - Sold to H. H. Baker, Buffalo & Lake Erie Excursion Company. Rebuilt as conventional single-screw excursion boat.

References

External links
Image of USRC Commodore Perry
Image of Periwinkle

1865 ships
Ships of the United States Revenue Cutter Service
Steamships of the United States
Ships built in Buffalo, New York